Heartbroken on the Moselle is a 1953 West German romantic comedy film directed by Kurt Hoffmann and starring Will Quadflieg, Elisabeth Müller, and Oliver Grimm. It was based on a 1932 novella by Rudolf G. Binding. It was shot at the Bavaria Studios in Munich with outdoor film taking place in Bayreuth in Bavaria and at various locations in the Rhineland. The film's sets were designed by the art director Rudi Remp.

Cast

References

Bibliography

External links 
 

1953 films
West German films
German romantic comedy films
1953 romantic comedy films
1950s German-language films
Films directed by Kurt Hoffmann
German black-and-white films
Films shot at Bavaria Studios
1950s German films